Ghost Song is a studio album by American jazz vocalist Cécile McLorin Salvant, on which she is accompanied by pianists Aaron Diehl and Sullivan Fortner. It was chosen as Album of the Month for both performance and sonics by Stereophile in April 2022.

Critical reception

In the Wall Street Journal, Larry Blumenfeld wrote, "Her ideas have grown bolder with each album, and especially with 'Ogresse,' an unreleased cantata for which she wrote the story, lyrics and music… 'Ghost Song' is her boldest act yet. Here, Ms. Salvant displays yet more sonic range and nuance—soaring through intervals, moving nimbly through tricky rhythms, and reveling in pithy turns of phrase. Her voice is singularly arresting, yet it is never a single sound. It's playful, nearly giddy, on “Optimistic Voices” (from The Wizard of Oz), and then sultry when that song segues into Gregory Porter's 'No Love Dying.' It's a blues holler to start the title track, one of seven original compositions, and nearly soft as a whisper to begin Sting's 'Until.'"

Track listing
Source:

References

2022 albums
Cécile McLorin Salvant albums